Tranquille River is a river located in the Thompson Country region of British Columbia. The river was discovered as gold-bearing in 1852. The river has been mined and the total value of gold mined is estimated at $250,000.

The river was named by fur traders of the Hudson's Bay Company for the Secwepemc Chief Pacamoos and nicknamed Tranquil for his quiet easy manner.

See also
List of British Columbia rivers

References

Rivers of British Columbia
Thompson Country

Gold mining in British Columbia